Dichomeris apludella is a moth of the family Gelechiidae. It was described by Julius Lederer in 1869. It is known from Iran.

References

apludella
Moths described in 1869